Sapaeans, Sapaei or Sapaioi (Ancient Greek, "Σαπαίοι") were a Thracian tribe close to the Greek city of Abdera. One of their kings was named Abrupolis
 and had allied himself with the Romans. They ruled Thrace after the Odrysians until its incorporation by the Roman Empire as a province.

Sapaean Kings of Thrace

 Cotys I son of Rhoemetalces c.57 BC-48 BC
 Rhescuporis I son of Cotys I 48 BC-41 BC
 Cotys II son of Rhescuporis I 42 BC – 15 BC
Thrace becomes a client state of Rome at 11 BC
 Rhoemetalces I son of Cotys II  15 BC – 12 AD
 Rhescuporis II son of Cotys II  in western Thrace; 12–18 AD deposed
 Cotys III  son of Rhoemetalces I  in eastern Thrace 12–18 murdered
 Rhoemetalces II son of Cotys III and Tryphaena 18–26
 Roman caretaker rules Rhoemetalces III part of Thrace 26-38
 Rhoemetalces III  son of Rhescuporis II  38–46
 46 to the Roman Empire

Family tree of Sapaean kings of Thrace

References

See also 
List of Thracian tribes

Thracian tribes
Ancient tribes in the Balkans
Ancient Thrace
Ancient Greece